Russell Creek is a stream in the U.S. state of Georgia. It is a tributary to the Etowah River.

Russell Creek took its name from Russell's Mill, a watermill on its banks. A variant name is "Russells Creek".

References

Rivers of Georgia (U.S. state)
Rivers of Dawson County, Georgia